La Bande à Papa , is a French comedy film from 1956, directed by Guy Lefranc, written by Roger Pierre, starring Fernand Raynaud and Louis de Funès. The film is known under the titles "La bande à papa" Belgium French title), "De bende van papa" (Belgium Dutch title).

Cast 
 Fernand Raynaud: Fernand Jérôme, Joseph's son, employee at "Crédit Populaire"
 Louis de Funès: chief commissioner Victor Eugène Merlerin
 Noël Roquevert: bandleader Joseph Jérôme aka "Grand J"
 Jean-Marc Tennberg: "toupee", band member
 Henri Crémieux: "professeur", band member
 Annie Noël: Renée Merlerin, the commissioner's daughter who is in love with Fernand
 Suzanne Dehelly: Gertrude, Fernand's grandmother
 Madeleine Barbulée: Mrs Merlerin, the commissioner's wife
 Geneviève Morel: the street vendor
 Marcel Bozzuffi: "Volaille", band member
 Paul Crauchet: Marcel, band member
 Pierre Duncan: Jo, band member
 Gaston Orbal: "the suit"

References

External links 
 
 La Bande à Papa (1956) at the Films de France

1956 films
French comedy films
1950s French-language films
French black-and-white films
Films directed by Guy Lefranc
1956 comedy films
1950s French films